Astron (previously named Esmeralda and Bonnie) is a shipwreck located off the coast of Punta Cana in the Dominican Republic. She was a Russian-owned cargo ship built in France by Chantiers de l'Atlantique during 1957.

Astron was delivering 60 tons of corn to Cuba on 7 April 1978, when she ran aground at Punta Cana during a storm. However, there is no hurricane or tropical storm listed during this date in the history of the Atlantic Hurricane season of 1978. This ship either hit a mine, was torpedoed, or intentionally scuttled, evidenced by the extensive ripped steel of the lower hull. She broke into two distinct sections with the bow above the water and the stern underwater, with 7,330 barrels of bunker fuel reported lost in the incident.

As of 2018 only a small portion remains above water.

References

External links 
 Astron shipwreck

Cargo ships of Russia
1957 ships
Shipwrecks in the Atlantic Ocean
Transport disasters in the Dominican Republic
Ships built by Chantiers de l'Atlantique
Maritime incidents in 1978